Vermelles is a commune in the Pas-de-Calais department in the Hauts-de-France region of France.

Geography

Coal mining

Vermelles was the second extraction site used by the Compagnie des mines de Béthune.
Extraction started in July 1860. 
Air compressors were installed in Mine 3 1877.
This proved the company's most productive mine, with a total of 1,525,000 tons.
Extraction started in 1867.
Mine 4 was abandoned in 1876 because the very irregular deposit at  seemed unusable.
There was a lot of firedamp compared to other mines.
The main shaft reached .

During World War I (1914–18) the Germans were stopped just to the east of Vermelles.
Mine 4 was recovered in December 1914.
Barricades were built as early as 1916 along the main axes of the mine complex so it could be defended while allowing ventilation and the passage of men.
Mines 3 and 4 in Vermelles were isolated from the rest of the mines by watertight doors.
Mine 4 was closed in 1965, and Mine 3 was closed in 1977.

Population

Places of interest

 The church of St. Pierre, rebuilt, along with most of the village, after the First World War.
 The war memorials.
 The modern church of Notre-Dame.
 The Commonwealth War Graves Commission cemeteries.

Twin town
 Glauchau, in Germany.

See also
Communes of the Pas-de-Calais department

References

Sources

External links

 The CWGC British cemetery
 The CWGC graves in the commune's cemetery
 CWGC Quarry Cemetery at Vermelles

Communes of Pas-de-Calais